Indy Pride Festival, formerly Circle City IN Pride, is the annual week of LGBT pride events in Indianapolis. The week is organized by LGBT organization Indy Pride, Inc., and has been held under this name and organization for over a decade. In recent years, more than 95,000 gay, lesbian, bisexual, transgender and heterosexual people have attended the festival. Indy Pride's Parade and Festival is held the 2nd Saturday in June, with a week of events leading up to it, in honor of the Stonewall Riots and in accordance with other United States pride festivals. Indy Pride Festival is the largest LGBT pride event in Indiana.

According to former Indy Pride President, Gary Brackett, "The festival and events are to celebrate gay pride and bring the community together. We're trying to bring visibility to the greater Indianapolis community of how many gay, lesbian, bisexual and transgender people there are here."

History

The first known Pride week in Indianapolis was celebrated in 1976 with the support of Metropolitan Community Church and Gay Peoples Union. However, the first Indy Pride, Inc., sponsored event began in 1996 as a week-long celebration of events. Jeffrey Cleary and Bill McKinley served as Co-Chairs for the city's first ever pride week. The celebration held 10 events in seven days, culminating with a pride fair on the downtown Indy Canal. In 2011, the festival broke records by attracting a record estimate 70,000 attendees. In 2012, the week of events opened with the new "Rainbow 5k Run/Walk". The festival saw the addition of a 2nd stage, as well as an expansion in family-friendly entertainment. Attendance grew every year in the following decade until 2020 and 2021 when the event was not held in person due to the COVID-19 pandemic.

Indy Pride Parade 
The first Indy Pride Parade stepped off in 2002, founded by Gary Brackett. The first parade was small with only eight participants and lasted 15 minutes. It has since grown into a 2-hour-plus-long event.

Anti-Pride protests and opposition 
In a 2016 interview, Gary Brackett acknowledged that a few protestors oppose the event every year. According to Brackett, both the crowd and the anti-Pride protestors have received police protection.

Festival

The festival includes several attractions for the LGBT community and allies, to browse and watch. Local LGBT groups and supportive businesses sponsor booths catering to the community as a whole, as well as special interest groups. Surrounding the park, food vendors and other businesses also set up displays to show support and to market to the community. The main stage overlooks the event and serves as a centerpiece for the festival. National and local talents provide performances from the stage. Performances have included the Pride of Indy Band, singers, national recording artists, drag performances, DJs, and speeches.

Performances have ranged from pure entertainment, such as RuPaul who performed at the close of the festival in 2006 and Kat DeLuna who performed in 2009, to informational speeches, such as from Candace Gingrich, who in 2007, gave a speech for the Human Rights Campaign on same-sex marriage issues. In 2012, the festival added a 2nd stage dedicated to DJs and dance music, as well as an area designated for family friendly entertainment.

2013 marked the 25th year of Indy's public LGBT Pride celebration.

Attendance
Estimated annual attendance, beginning with 2002:

Cadillac Barbie Indy Pride Parade

The annual parade began in 2002, and runs from Mass Ave, which is the city's unofficial gayborhood, to the heart of downtown Indianapolis. Parade grand marshals have included celebrities and politicians, including the late congresswoman Julia Carson. The parade grew to more than 100 floats and participants by 2009.

Grand marshals
2006: Julia Carson, congresswoman
2007: Del Shores, writer and producer
2009: Broadway cast of Wicked
2010: Indy Bag Ladies
2011: Cadillac Barbie (Gary K. Brackett), founder
2012: Jordan Windle, youngest diver to ever qualify for the USA Diving Olympic Team Trials, and adopted son of two fathers.
2013: Indiana Youth Group
2014: Coburn "Coby" Palmer (one of the original Indy Bag Ladies), Layshia Clarendon, point guard for the Indiana Fever, Megan Roberson of Freedom Indiana, and Rick Sutton of Indiana Equality Action for their efforts in the law arena.
2015: Greg Ballard, Mayor of Indianapolis
2016: Alice Langford, community advocate; and Betty Wilson, president and CEO of The Health Foundation of Greater Indianapolis, Inc.
2017: Chris Paulsen and Deanna Medsker, LGBTQ rights advocates
2018: Finley C. Norris, Margaret Irish, Mark A. Lee, Terrell Parker, Jenna Scott, Wes Scott
2019: Shelly Fitzgerald, State Senator J. D. Ford, Trinity Haven, and Low Pone
2020: Indy Bag Ladies and Indianapolis City-County Council members Ali Brown, Ethan Evans, Keith Potts, and Zach Adamson (parade canceled due to the COVID-19 pandemic)
2021: Parade not held due to the COVID-19 pandemic
2022: Trans Solutions Research & Resource Center, GenderNexus, ACLU of Indiana, Indianapolis City-County Council members Zach Adamson, Ali Brown, Ethan Evans, and Keith Potts

See also

Indy Pride
List of LGBT events
Pride of Indy Band and Color Guard
List of attractions and events in Indianapolis

External links
Indy Pride
Indy Pride Festival
Pride of Indy Bands
Indiana Youth Group
Indianapolis PFLAG

References

LGBT events in Indiana
Festivals in Indianapolis
Festivals established in 2002
2002 establishments in Indiana
Pride parades in the United States